George J. Miscovich (1916–1999) was American-Croat politician and speaker of the Alaska territorial House of Representatives.

Biography
He was born in Flat in family of scientist Peter Miscovich and Stane Bagoy, two Croatian emigrants. He got his name by his grandfather George (cro. Đuro). He attended high school in Fairbanks and he served with the US Army Air Forces in World War II. Afterward George was a miner near Flat and Poorman. George was elected to the Alaska territorial House of Representatives as a Republican in 1948. From 1953. to 1955, he was speaker of the House.

References
 American Legislative Leaders in the West, 1911–1994, p. 197

External links
 George Miscovich at 100 Years of Alaska's Legislature

1916 births
1999 deaths
Republican Party members of the Alaska House of Representatives
United States Army Air Forces personnel of World War II
American miners
American people of Croatian descent
Members of the Alaska Territorial Legislature
Politicians from Fairbanks, Alaska
Speakers of the Alaska House of Representatives
20th-century American politicians
Military personnel from Fairbanks, Alaska